Marcus Hubrich (born 5 February 1963) is an alpine skier from New Zealand.

He competed for New Zealand at the 1984 Winter Olympics at Sarajevo; and came 35th in the Downhill, 14th in the Slalom, and 29th in the Giant Slalom. He was the New Zealand flagbearer at the games.

He is a brother of 1984 and 1988 alpine skier Mattias Hubrich.

References 
 Black Gold by Ron Palenski (2008, 2004 New Zealand Sports Hall of Fame, Dunedin) p. 105.

External links 
 
 

Living people
1963 births
New Zealand male alpine skiers
Olympic alpine skiers of New Zealand
Alpine skiers at the 1984 Winter Olympics